Budukh or Budugh (Будад мез, Budad mez) is a Samur language of the Northeast Caucasian language family spoken in parts of the Quba Rayon of Azerbaijan. It is spoken by about 200 of approximately 1,000 ethnic Budukhs.

Budukh is a severely endangered language, and classified as such by UNESCO's Atlas of the World's Languages in Danger.

Grammar

Gender and agreement 
Authier (2010) reports that Budugh has six 'gender-number' classes: 
human masculine,
human adult feminine,
animate (which includes animals, plants, and non-adult human females, as well as some abstract nouns),
inanimate,
nonhuman plural,
human plural.

Verbs normally agree with their absolutive argument (intransitive subject or transitive object) in gender.  In the following examples, the verb 'beat' shows animate agreement with 'donkey' and non-human plural agreement with 'donkeys'.

Compare these examples with the following, where the verb agrees with the intransitive subject:

Verb agreement 
Budukh verbs typically agree with a single argument, the absolutive.  In the agreement paradigms, the majority of verbs show no overt agreement for the masculine, neuter, and nonhuman plural.  Consider the following paradigm for the verb 'keep' in the perfective (Authier 2009):

 
In this paradigm, /ˤa/ is a preverb which must appear with the verb root /q/ 'keep', and the agreement morphology appears between the preverb and the root. Due to historical changes, the relationships between the various members of an agreement paradigm are often more complex and show changes of vowel and/or consonant.  The following perfective paradigm for 'go' shows this (with the reconstructed form shown after the *)

Word order 
Budukh is an SOV language, as seen in the following example:

It has possessors before possessed nouns:

Adjectives appear before the nouns that they modify:

References 
Authier, Gilles. 2009. Development of Introflexion (Root-and-pattern Morphology) in Budugh Verbs http://www.digitorient.com/wp/wp-content/uploads/2009/12/introflexionBudugh.doc
Authier, Gilles. 2010. Finite and Non-Finite: Prosodic Distinctions on Budugh Verb Stems.  In Clause Linking and Clause Hierarchy: Syntax and Pragmatics, ed. by Isabelle Bril.  Amsterdam: John Benjamins. pp 143–164.

External links
Budukh basic lexicon at the Global Lexicostatistical Database

Northeast Caucasian languages
Languages of Azerbaijan
Endangered Caucasian languages